The 2014–15 Los Angeles Kings season was the 48th season (47th season of play) for the National Hockey League franchise that was established on June 5, 1967. The Kings failed to qualify for the Stanley Cup playoffs for the first time since the 2008–09 season, becoming the first team since the 2006–07 Carolina Hurricanes to fail to qualify for the playoffs after winning the Stanley Cup the previous season.

Regular season 
The team entered the regular season as the defending champions. Having won two Stanley Cup championships in the last three years, the Kings entered were the early favorites to retain their title. Again, however, Los Angeles' post-championship home opener was a defeat, this time a 4–0 blowout to cross-state rival San Jose Sharks. The following game was an overtime defeat to the Arizona Coyotes, followed by a home win against the Winnipeg Jets. During the season, the Kings took part in their second outdoor game, this time visiting the Sharks at Levi's Stadium for the 2015 NHL Stadium Series. The Kings struggled often during the season, with scoring slumps, defensemen losing games to injury and suspensions and frequent road losses. LA Kings at least had a lackluster of play. But the end of the season, they were caught and missed the playoffs by two points.

Standings

Suspensions/fines

Schedule and results

Pre-season

Regular season

Player statistics
Final stats

Skaters
Note: GP = Games played; G = Goals; A = Assists; Pts = Points; +/− = Plus/minus; PIM = Penalty minutes
Final Stats

Goaltenders
Note: GP = Games played; GS = Games started; TOI = Time on ice; W = Wins; L = Losses; OT = Overtime losses; GA = Goals against; GAA = Goals against average; SV = Saves; SA = Shots against; SV% = Save percentage; SO = Shutouts; G = Goals; A = Assists; PIM = Penalty minutes
Final stats

†Denotes player spent time with another team before joining the Kings. Stats reflect time with the Kings only.
‡Traded mid-season. Stats reflect time with the Kings only.
Bold/italics denotes franchise record

Notable achievements

Awards

Milestones

Transactions 
The Kings have been involved in the following transactions during the 2014–15 season:

Trades

Free agents acquired

Free agents lost

Claimed via waivers

Lost via waivers

Lost via retirement

Player signings

Draft picks 

The 2014 NHL Entry Draft will be held on June 27–28, 2014, at the Wells Fargo Center in Philadelphia, Pennsylvania.

Draft notes

 The Tampa Bay Lightning's second-round pick (previously acquired by the Vancouver Canucks) went to the Los Angeles Kings as a result of a trade on June 28, 2014, that sent Linden Vey to the Canucks in exchange for this pick.
 The Los Angeles Kings' second-round pick was re-acquired as the result of a trade on March 5, 2014, that sent Hudson Fasching and Nicolas Deslauriers to Buffalo in exchange for Brayden McNabb, Jonathan Parker, Los Angeles' second-round pick in 2015 and this pick.
Buffalo previously acquired this pick as the result of a trade on April 1, 2013 that sent Robyn Regehr to Los Angeles in exchange for a second-round pick in 2015 and this pick.
 The Carolina Hurricanes' sixth-round pick went to the Los Angeles Kings as a result of a January 13, 2013, trade that sent Kevin Westgarth to the Hurricanes in exchange for Anthony Stewart, a 2013 fourth-round pick (#96–Kyle Platzer) and this pick.
 The New York Rangers' seventh-round pick went to the Los Angeles Kings as a result of a January 4, 2014, trade that sent Daniel Carcillo to the Rangers in exchange for this pick.

References

Los Angeles Kings seasons
Los
Los
LA Kings
LA Kings